Gelechia elephantopis is a moth of the family Gelechiidae. It is found in Venezuela.

References

Moths described in 1936
Gelechia